"Around the World" is the debut Japanese single recorded by hip hop boy group Got7, released on October 22, 2014 by Epic Records Japan. "Around the World" debuted at number three on the weekly Oricon Singles Chart, selling over 36,000 copies.

Background and release
The single's PV was released in full on October 1. The B-side track "So Lucky" was written and composed by 2PM's Jun. K.  It was released in three physical versions: version A, a CD+DVD version with a music video and an off-shot video; version B, another CD+DVD version with various music videos and photo cards; and version C, a CD only version with an additional track.

Formats and track listings
CD+DVD single (Version A)
Disc 1 (CD)
"AROUND THE WORLD"
"SO LUCKY"
"AROUND THE WORLD" (Instrumental)
"SO LUCKY" (Instrumental)
Disc 2 (DVD)
"AROUND THE WORLD" (Music video)
"AROUND THE WORLD" (Making movie)

CD+DVD single (Version B)
Disc 1 (CD)
"AROUND THE WORLD"
"SO LUCKY"
"AROUND THE WORLD" (Instrumental)
"SO LUCKY" (Instrumental)
Disc 2 (DVD)
"AROUND THE WORLD" (Dance version)
"AROUND THE WORLD" (Front version)
"AROUND THE WORLD" (Mirror version)
"AROUND THE WORLD" (Close-up version)

CD single
"AROUND THE WORLD"
"SO LUCKY"
"AROUND THE WORLD" (Instrumental)
"SO LUCKY" (Instrumental)

Charts

Sales

References

2014 singles
2014 songs
Got7 songs
Epic Records singles